Ladik Lake is a lake in Samsun Province, Asiatic Turkey. Anciently it was called Stiphane, and was located in the northwestern part of ancient Pontus, in the district called Phazemonitis. According to Strabo, the lake abounded in fish, and its shores afforded excellent pasture. The southern shore of Ladik Lake was the epicenter of the 7.8–8.0  1668 North Anatolia earthquake, which is the most powerful earthquake recorded in Turkey.

References

External links

Lakes of Turkey
Geography of Samsun Province